Espen Børufsen (born 4 March 1988) is a Norwegian former footballer who played as a midfielder. He spent his entire professional career with Start.

He was extensively capped as a youth international, most for U21. As a youth player Børufsen played for FK Våg. He joined Start in the 2005 season. He retired after the 2020 season.

Career statistics

References

 Player profile - IK Start

1988 births
Living people
Sportspeople from Kristiansand
Norway youth international footballers
Norway under-21 international footballers
Norwegian footballers
IK Start players
Eliteserien players
Norwegian First Division players
Association football midfielders
Association football forwards